Just Enough Education to Perform is the third studio album by Welsh rock band Stereophonics. Released on 11 April 2001, the album topped the UK Albums Chart with 140,000 copies sold. and spawned three top-ten singles in the form of "Mr. Writer", "Have a Nice Day", Step on My Old Size Nines" and "Handbags and Gladrags". The album's title comes from a line in the song "Mr. Writer".

When the album was originally released it had 11 tracks; it was then re-released in 2002 to include "Handbags and Gladrags" after it was released as a single.

Reception

Critical response

Just Enough Education to Perform received generally mixed to positive reviews. At Metacritic, which assigns a weighted average rating out of 100 to reviews from mainstream critics, the album received an average score of 68 based on 10 reviews. Despite some negative reviews, it had their highest score on Metacritic until 2022's Oochya! exceeded it by one point with a score of 69.

Writing in Observer Music Monthly, Tony Heyman commented on the title of the album, claiming "regardless of their level of education, the Stereophonics clearly have no performing qualities whatsoever. If they are suggesting a connection between formal education and musical ability, they must be four illiterate morons who were expelled from playschool for being too thick." Heyman launched a rant against the group, referring to the album as "musical excrement, scooped unhygienically from a poorly-maintained squat toilet in an area without adequate sanitation." He suggested that if it wasn't laminated, the CD insert booklet could be distributed to third-world communities as toilet paper.

Commercial performance
On its initial release in 2001, Just Enough Education to Perform reached number 1 in the UK charts where it stayed for two weeks, it topped the charts for another two weeks in the second week of January 2002, nine months after its initial release. The album then went on to re-enter the charts several times: it peaked at number 27 during June 2002, number 37 in July 2003 and number 34 in August 2003, until finally disappearing from the top 100. In 2001 it was the 4th biggest selling album in the UK, and in 2002 it was the 24th biggest selling album in the UK, as well as being the 39th biggest selling album of the decade. It went on to be certified 5× platinum in the UK. As of 2009 it has sold 83,000 copies in the United States according to Nielsen SoundScan.

Track listing

Personnel

Stereophonics
 Kelly Jones – vocals, guitar,
 Richard Jones – bass, harmonica
 Stuart Cable – drums

Additional musicians
 Marshall Bird – piano, backing vocals, Wurlitzer, harmonica
 Aileen McLaughlin – backing vocals on "Vegas Two Times"
 Anna Ross – backing vocals on "Vegas Two Times"
 Hazel Fernandez – backing vocals on "Vegas Two Times"
 Glenn Hyde – harmonica on "Rooftop"

Technical personnel
Production – Bird, Steve Bush
Engineering – Bird & Bush
Mixing – Andy Wallace
Mastering – Bob Ludwig
Production on "Handbags and Gladrags" – Laurie Latham, Stereophonics

Charts and certifications

Weekly charts

Year-end charts

Certifications

Popular culture
• Manchester United and England forward Wayne Rooney has the album's name tattooed in a design on his right forearm. Rooney is a longtime fan of the band and is good friends with them.

• "Mr. Writer" was intended to appear in Grand Theft Auto V on a cut radio station titled "PMR".

References

Stereophonics albums
2001 albums
V2 Records albums